was a town located in Agatsuma District, Gunma Prefecture, Japan.

As of 2003, the town had an estimated population of 14,881 and a density of 67.58 persons per km². The total area was 220.20 km².

On March 27, 2006, Agatsuma, along with the village of Azuma (also from Agatsuma District), was merged to create the town of Higashiagatsuma.

External links
 Higashiagatsuma official website 

Dissolved municipalities of Gunma Prefecture
Higashiagatsuma, Gunma